Mark Ryutin (Russian: Марк Рютин; born 26 March 1988 in Russia) is a Russian retired footballer who last played for Thisted in Denmark.

Career
Ryutin started his senior career with Zaria Bălți. In 2010, he signed for Gagauziya-Oguzsport in the Moldovan National Division, where he made eight league appearances and scored zero goals. After that, he played for Skála ÍF, Vendsyssel FF, and Thisted.

References

External links 
 Mark Ryutin: “Moldova Championship is a great place for a young player” 
 Mark Ryutin: From Big-City Russia to the Faroe Islands
 “Sometimes I travel by bus, but they are very expensive - 600 rubles.” The fate of the Russian goalkeeper in the Faroe Islands 
 Our man in the Faroe Islands 
 Goals goalkeeper Mark Ryutin: In Faroe Islands everyone loves football

1988 births
Living people
Russian footballers
Association football goalkeepers
Russian expatriate footballers
Expatriate footballers in Moldova
Expatriate men's footballers in Denmark
Expatriate footballers in the Faroe Islands
CSF Bălți players
Gagauziya-Oguzsport players
Skála ÍF players
Vendsyssel FF players